Quart (Issime ) is a town and comune in the Aosta Valley region of north-western Italy.

Main sights 
The Quart Castle, built starting from 1185 by Jacques de la Porte de Saint-Ours, founder of the Lords of Quart.

On the slopes below the castle, near Vollein, in 1968 remains of the Neolithic Vollein necropolis were found.

Other sights include a series of medieval watchtowers, such as the Chétoz Tower, the museum of Aosta Valley Railroads, and a fortified house in Povil.

References

Cities and towns in Aosta Valley